The 2007–08 Danish 1st Division season was the 13th season of the Danish 1st Division league championship, governed by the Danish Football Association. It took place from the first match on August 4, 2007 to the final match on June 8, 2008.

The division-champion and runner-up promotes to the 2008–09 Danish Superliga. The teams in the 14th, 15th and 16th places will be divided between 2nd Division East and West, based on location.

You can see the fixture schedule here.

Participants

Odds

Before the season, Superliga-relegated Vejle was considered the 8/5-favorite to win the division and regain promotion along with fellow relegated Silkeborg at 23/10, with former Superliga-side SønderjyskE the only notable contender for the title at 15/4. The outsiders for promotion were local rivals Kolding and Fredericia.

The fight in the middle of the pack was predicted to contended by AB, Herfølge, Næstved, Køge and Frem, while Lolland-Falster Alliancen, Ølstykke and HIK would contend the lower third.

The two newly promoted teams, Skive and Hvidovre were, along with last year's 11th-place finisher, Aarhus Fremad, the favorites to get relegated.

League table

Top goalscorers

See also
 2007-08 in Danish football

References

External links
  Viasat Divisionen at the Danish FA's homepage.
  1. division 2007-08 at Haslund.info

Danish 1st Division seasons
Denmark
2007–08 in Danish football